Broadway to Cheyenne is a 1932 American pre-Code Western film directed by Harry L. Fraser. The film is also known as From Broadway to Cheyenne (American poster title). The film successfully combines the Western with the gangster film and vigilante film.

Plot
A young and honest New York Police Department detective "Breezy" Kildare is attempting to arrest B.H. "Butch" Owens, the leader of a gang of criminals who attempted to bribe him. He is wounded in a shootout between Owens' gang and another gang in a Broadway night club.

His police chief allows him to recuperate and cool down in his thirst for justice back in his home of Wyoming where his father is a cattleman. Once arriving back home he soon discovers the gangsters who attempted to bribe and kill him are lying low there and diversifying by starting a Cattleman's Benevolent Association that is actually a protection racket protecting the cattlemen from such perils as having their cattle machine gunned.

When his father is shot in a drive-by shooting, Breezy leads the cattlemen against the well-armed gangsters who no longer have the power of a bribed administration or high-powered legal protection, but now have to face six-gun justice and lynch law.

Cast
Rex Bell as "Breezy" Kildare
Marceline Day as Ruth Carter
Matthew Betz as Joe Carter
Robert Ellis as B.H. "Butch" Owens
George 'Gabby' Hayes as Walrus
Huntley Gordon as New York City Dist. Atty. Brent 
Roy D'Arcy as Jess Harvey
Gwen Lee as Mrs. Myrna Wallace
Harry Semels as Louie Walsh
Al Bridge as Al (Owens henchman)
John Elliott as Martin Kildare
Gordon De Main as Rancher
Earl Dwire as Cattleman

External links

1932 films
1930s English-language films
American black-and-white films
1932 crime drama films
1932 Western (genre) films
1930s vigilante films
Monogram Pictures films
American Western (genre) films
American crime drama films
American vigilante films
Films set in Manhattan
Films set in Wyoming
Films with screenplays by Harry L. Fraser
Films directed by Harry L. Fraser
1930s American films